Lookout is an unincorporated community in Delaware Township, Ripley County, in the U.S. state of Indiana.

History
A post office was established at Lookout in 1889, and remained in operation until it was discontinued in 1906.

Geography

References

Unincorporated communities in Ripley County, Indiana
Unincorporated communities in Indiana